The 2005 Yale Bulldogs football team represented Yale University in the 2005 NCAA Division I-AA football season.  The Bulldogs were led by ninth year head coach Jack Siedlecki, played their home games at the Yale Bowl and finished tied for fourth in the Ivy League with a 4–3 record, 4–6 overall.

Schedule

Roster

References

Yale
Yale Bulldogs football seasons
Yale Bulldogs football